Chinna Pillai is a community leader from Pulliseri, a small village near Madurai, Tamil Nadu, India. She had started a very successful banking system in the villages of Tamil Nadu, and has done significant contributions to reduce poverty and debt grievances by empowering women.  Her efforts in starting a savings unit among the women of the debt stricken village of Pullucheri had become so successful that soon many groups sprung up in this region which had tried to emulate the same model within their community. The Kalanjiam microcredit movement received a huge boost from her dedication and contributions, reaching out to many women living under poverty.

Chinna Pillai is illiterate and can only sign her name. She was recognized as a leader because of her skills as a negotiator. She bargained on behalf of workers and eventually the employers realized that there may be some benefit in paying higher wages.

Once, Chinna Pillai had gone to the collector's office to demand for a contract for fishing in the fishing pond of the Pulliseri village for the poorer communities of the village, which earlier was always given to the richer landlords of the village. The collector after listening to their grievances had then encouraged them to bid for the contract. One of the landlords had objected to this, and having powerful political connections as well as being an influential man in the village denied them the right to work in the fields. Not being intimidated, her group decided to find work outside the village, and many people were willing to employ them. Today, pisciculture is a source of income for the Kalanjiam group.

Recognition
Chinna Pillai was one of five women to receive the Stree Shakti Puraskar in 1999. In a picture perfect moment for the press, then-Prime Minister Atal Bihari Vajpayee bowed down in respect and touched her feet while presenting her with the award. She had received the Padma Shri for her service in 2019.

References

1960s births
Living people
Indian microfinance people
People from Madurai district
Businesswomen from Tamil Nadu
Businesspeople from Tamil Nadu
Recipients of the Padma Shri in social work
20th-century Indian businesswomen
20th-century Indian businesspeople